Lee Edward "BeeBee" Richard (born September 18, 1948) is a former Major League Baseball infielder.

Playing career
He played primarily at shortstop, especially early in his career, but his defense was poor, and he later appeared more as a second baseman or third baseman. He was traded from the White Sox to the Cardinals for Buddy Bradford and Greg Terlecky on December 12, 1975.

References

External links

1948 births
Baseball players from Louisiana
Chicago White Sox players
Columbus Clippers players
Hawaii Islanders players
Indianapolis Indians players
Iowa Oaks players
Living people
Major League Baseball shortstops
Mobile White Sox players
Panama Banqueros players
Sportspeople from Lafayette, Louisiana
St. Louis Cardinals players
Southern Jaguars baseball players
Tucson Toros players